The Embassy of Malaysia in the Netherlands is the diplomatic mission of Malaysia and is situated in The Hague, Netherlands. It is located at Rustenburgweg 2 in The Hague, in a diplomatic zone of the seat of government in the Netherlands. Opening hours are from 9:00 to 16:30 pm Monday to Friday. Consular hours are from 09:00 to 12:30 Monday to Thursday.

Brief History
When Malaysia (then Malaya) applied to join the United Nations in 1957, the Netherlands was one of the countries that voted “yes” during the roll call for the admission of new members, making it possible for the Federation of Malaya to become the 82nd the member of the United Nations. Although the establishment of diplomatic relations between the two countries started in that same year, Malaysia only established its resident Embassy in The Hague in September 1966. It moved to its permanent building at Rustenburgweg in the summer of 1985.

Agencies under the Embassy

In addition to the Chancery building in Rustenburgweg, there are three Malaysian agencies which operate as part of the Embassy:
 The Malaysia External Trade Development Corporation (MATRADE), located in Rotterdam
Culture / Tourism Office, located in the city centre in The Hague
 Agriculture Office, located in Rotterdam

List of Malaysian Ambassadors to the Netherlands

See also 
 Malaysia–Netherlands relations

References

Malaysia
Diplomatic missions of Malaysia
Malaysia–Netherlands relations